Lithocarpus coopertus is a tree in the beech family Fagaceae. The specific epithet  is from the Latin meaning "covered over", referring to the acorn.

Description
The greyish brown bark is smooth, flaky or lenticellate.

Distribution and habitat
Lithocarpus coopertus grows naturally in Peninsular Malaysia, Borneo and the Philippines. Its habitat is dipterocarp, peat swamp and kerangas forests up to  altitude.

Uses
The timber is used locally in home construction and for firewood.

References

coopertus
Trees of Peninsular Malaysia
Trees of Borneo
Trees of the Philippines
Plants described in 1845
Taxa named by Francisco Manuel Blanco
Taxa named by Alfred Rehder